Chris Toshiro Todd is an American politician and a Democratic member of the Hawaii House of Representatives since January 2017 representing District 2 (Hilo).  Todd was appointed by Governor David Ige on January 5, 2017, to replace the late Clift Tsuji.

Education
Todd earned his BA in economics and political science from the University of Hawaii at Hilo and is a 2006 graduate of Hilo High School.

References

External links
Official page at the Hawaii State Legislature

American politicians of Japanese descent
Year of birth missing (living people)
Living people
Hawaii politicians of Japanese descent
Democratic Party members of the Hawaii House of Representatives
University of Hawaiʻi at Hilo alumni
21st-century American politicians